The Zagreb local elections of 2005 were held on 15 May 2005 in Zagreb, the capital of Croatia. Following the last local elections in 2001, Milan Bandić of the Social Democratic Party of Croatia (SDP) had been re-elected as the mayor of Zagreb. In 2002, an incident made him resign in favor of Deputy Mayor Vlasta Pavić, also from the SDP. Pavić remained formally in control of the city until 2005. In the 2005 elections, she was moved down the list of candidates to the 16th place, while the list holder and SDP's candidate for mayor was Bandić.

The elections mainly pitted two former mayors, Bandić of the SDP and Marina Matulović Dropulić of the  Croatian Democratic Union (HDZ). The SDP formed a coalition with the Croatian Peasant Party (HSS) and the Croatian Party of Pensioners (HSU), while the HDZ was in a coalition with the Democratic Centre (DC), the Croatian Social Liberal Party (HSLS), and the Croatian Demochristians (HD). The SDP gained 25 seats in the Zagreb Assembly, receiving 40.95% of the vote, with Milan Bandić winning his third term as the Zagreb mayor.

Coalitions 
The Social Democratic Party of Croatia (SDP) ran with the Croatian Peasant Party (HSS) and the Croatian Party of Pensioners (HSU). Former Mayor Milan Bandić, who had to resign from his earlier term due to a driving under the influence scandal in 2002, was the list holder and the coalition's candidate for mayor. Vesna Pusić, the head of the Croatian People's Party (HNS), announced that the HNS won't be a member of the coalition due to the candidacy of Bandić. Pusić added that Milan Bandić is "at the top of each affair causing damage" to the city.

The SDP and the HNS were in coalition in the previous Assembly. Due to this breakup, the HNS ran together with the Liberal Party (LS), with Pusić as the list holder.  The Croatian Democratic Union (HDZ) entered a coalition with the Democratic Centre (DC), the Croatian Demochristians (HD), and the Croatian Social Liberal Party (HSLS).

Results 

The turnout at the election was 35%. The SDP–HSS–HSU coalition, led by incumbent Mayor Milan Bandić, won 41% of the vote and 25 out of 51 seats in the Zagreb Assembly. Bandić was elected mayor by the new Assemby and started his third term as the mayor of Zagreb. The HDZ–DC–HSLS–HD coalition, with former Mayor Marina Matulović Dropulić as the list holder, won 9 seats, while the HSP list, led by Miroslav Rožić, finished third with 6 seats. The HNS–LS coalition won 8% of the vote and 4 seats, down from 12 in the 2001 elections. The LS was later incorporated into the HSLS.

Milan Bandić was elected mayor by the Assembly on 14 June 2005.

Assembly election

|-
!align= center rowspan="2" colspan="2"|Parties and coalitions
! rowspan="2" |List holder
! colspan="3"| Popular vote
! colspan="2"| Seats
|- align="center"
!width="85"| Votes
!width="50"| %
!width="50"| ±pp
!width="40"| Total
!width="40"| +/−
|-
|bgcolor=|
|align = left  | Social Democratic Party of Croatia (SDP)Croatian Peasant Party (HSS)Croatian Party of Pensioners (HSU)
|align = left | Milan Bandić
|align = right | 102,857
|align = right | 40.95%
|align="right" style="color:green;"| +13.88
|align = right | 25
|align = right style="color:green;"| +5
|-
|bgcolor=|
|align = left  | Croatian Democratic Union (HDZ)Democratic Centre (DC)Croatian Social Liberal Party (HSLS)Croatian Demochristians (HD)
|align = left | Marina Matulović Dropulić
|align = right | 38,672
|align = right | 15.40%
|align="right" style="color:red;"| –4.51
|align = right | 9
|align = right style="color:red;"| –5
|-
|bgcolor=|
|align = left  | Croatian Party of Rights (HSP)
|align = left | Miroslav Rožić
|align = right | 28,534
|align = right | 11.36%
|align = right | *
|align = right | 6
|align = right | *
|-
|bgcolor=|
|align = left  | Croatian People's Party (HNS)Liberal Party (LS)
|align = left | Vesna Pusić
|align = right | 20,368
|align = right | 8.11%
|align = right style="color:red;"| –9.43
|align = right | 4
|align = right style="color:red;"| –8
|-
|bgcolor=|
|align = left  | Independent list of Tatjana Holjevac
|align = left | Tatjana Holjevac
|align = right | 17,497
|align = right | 6.97%
|align = right | New
|align = right | 4
|align = right | New
|-
|bgcolor=|
|align = left  | Independent list of Boris Mikšić
|align = left | Boris Mikšić
|align = right | 14,807
|align = right | 5.90%
|align="right" | New
|align = right | 3
|align = right | New
|-
| |
| align=left colspan=2  | Other lists
|align = right | 28,415
|align = right | 11.31%
|align = right | 
|align = right | 0
|align = right | 
|-
| align=left colspan=3 style="background-color:#eaecf0" | Total:
| align=right style="background-color:#eaecf0"| 251,150
| align=right style="background-color:#eaecf0"| 
| align=right style="background-color:#eaecf0"| 
| align=right style="background-color:#eaecf0"| 51
| align=right style="background-color:#eaecf0"| 
|-
| align=left colspan=3 | Invalid votes:
| align=right | 4,019
| align=right | 1.57%
| align=right | 
| align=right | 
| align=right | 
|-
| align=left colspan=3 | Turnout:
| align=right | 255,321
| align=right | 35.94%
| align=right style="color:red;"| –3.85
| align=right | 
| align=right | 
|-
| align=left colspan=3 | Registered voters:
| align=right | 710,344
| align=right | 
| align=right | 
| align=right | 
| align=right | 
|-
| colspan="8" align="left" | 
|-
| colspan="8" align="left" | Source: City Election Committee
|-
| colspan="8" align="left" | Notes: 
|}

Councils of districts

See also
List of mayors of Zagreb

References

External links 

 Izbori 

Zagreb 2005
Elections in Zagreb
Zagreb
Zagreb
2000s in Zagreb
Zagreb local election